The Golden Wattle Cookery Book is a popular Australian recipe book which was first published in Perth, Western Australia in 1924.

Authors
The book was compiled by Margaret Wylie and the teaching staff of the Perth Household Management Centre. Other Centre staff who contributed to the book include Mabel E. Yewers, Margaret H. Reeves, Doris S. Gray and Marie A. McKinnon.

Contents
The book contains simple and easy to follow recipes, such as barley water, fricassee of chicken, and jam tarts. It also has hints and helpful advice on what to look for when buying and preparing fresh produce.

Versions
The book has been reprinted 27 times. Versions include the 1930 third edition (240 pages, published by E.S. Wigg & Son); and the 1942 eighth edition (280 pages).

Publication history
1924, Australia, E.S. Wigg OCLC 219860048, 200 pages
1975, Australia, E.S. Wigg OCLC 221950040, 262 pages, 22nd edition with metric conversion
2003, Australia, Angus & Robertson , 262 pages, 34th edition

See also
Australian cuisine
The English and Australian Cookery Book

References

External links
 Library holdings of The Golden Wattle Cookery Book

Australian cookbooks
1924 non-fiction books